Humaira Khatoon is a Pakistani politician who has been a member of the Provincial Assembly of Khyber Pakhtunkhwa since August 2018.

Education
She has received matriculation level education.

Political career
She was elected to the Provincial Assembly of Khyber Pakhtunkhwa as a candidate of Muttahida Majlis-e-Amal on a reserved seat for women in 2018 Pakistani general election.

References

Living people
Muttahida Majlis-e-Amal MPAs (Khyber Pakhtunkhwa)
Women members of the Provincial Assembly of Khyber Pakhtunkhwa
Year of birth missing (living people)